The Bank of Namibia (BoN) is the central bank of Namibia, whose establishment is enshrined in Article 128 of the Namibian Constitution. It is located in the capital city of Windhoek. The Bank of Namibia was established in 1990 by the Bank of Namibia Act, 1990 (Act 8 of 1990). The Bank of Namibia is the only institution that is permitted to issue the Namibian dollar by authority that has been given to it under an Act of the Namibian Parliament. The head of the Bank of Namibia is the Governor of the Bank of Namibia.

Governors

The Governors to date have been:

 Wouter Bernard (16 June 1990 - 31 August 1991)
 Erik Lennart Karlsson (1 September 1991 - 31 December 1993)
 Jaafar bin Ahmad (1 January 1994 - 31 December 1996)
 Tom Alweendo (1 January 1997 - 25 March 2010)
 Ipumbu Shiimi (25 March 2010 - 1 June 2020)
 Johannes !Gawaxab (1 June 2020 - present)

The bank is engaged in policies to promote financial inclusion and is a member of the Alliance for Financial Inclusion. On March 5, 2012, the Bank of Namibia announced it would be making specific commitments to financial inclusion under the Maya Declaration.

See also

 Namibian dollar
 Economy of Namibia
 List of central banks of Africa
 List of central banks

References

External links

Government-owned companies of Namibia
Economy of Namibia
Namibia
Banks established in 1990
Banks of Namibia
Companies based in Windhoek
Namibian companies established in 1990